Mary Alexander "Molly" Yard (July 6, 1912 – September 21, 2005) was an American feminist of the late 20th century and social activist who served as National Organization for Women (NOW)'s eighth president from 1987 to 1991 and was a link between first and second-wave feminism.

Early life
She was born in Chengdu, Sichuan province, China, the daughter of Methodist missionaries. She graduated in 1933 from Swarthmore College, a coeducational college that was also the alma mater of Alice Paul. While at Swarthmore, she led a successful drive to eliminate the systematic sorority bigotry in place there after a Jewish fellow student had been denied admission to her sorority, Kappa Alpha Theta.  In 1938 she married Sylvester Garrett, a union that lasted until his death in 1996.

Early career and politics
She became active in Democratic Party politics, and in the late 1940s and early 1950s worked with the Clark-Dilworth team to unseat the entrenched city machine in Philadelphia. Two years later, she worked in Helen Gahagan Douglas' unsuccessful campaign for the U.S. Senate against second-year Congressman Richard Nixon's effective campaign attacks on Gahagan Douglas in California.

She moved to Pittsburgh in 1953, where she worked in the gubernatorial campaign of Mayor David L. Lawrence in 1958, led the Western Pennsylvania presidential campaigns of John F. Kennedy in 1960 and George McGovern in 1972, led the unsuccessful campaign to get NAACP President Byrd Brown the Democratic nomination to Congress, and was co-chair with Mayor Joseph M. Barr of the unsuccessful U.S. Senate campaign of Jeanette Reibman in 1976.

She made an unsuccessful run for the state legislature as a candidate from Pittsburgh's Ward 14 in 1964.

In addition to her political work, she helped found Americans for Democratic Action (ADA), America's oldest independent liberal lobbying organization, and the Pittsburgh's 14th Ward Independent Democratic Club.  She was also the organization secretary and national chairwoman of the American Student Union.

Activities in the National Organization for Women
She became active in NOW while a resident of the Squirrel Hill neighborhood of Pittsburgh in 1974, and joined the national staff in 1978 during the unsuccessful campaign to ratify the Equal Rights Amendment (ERA), serving as a lobbyist in Washington, D.C. She raised more than $1 million in less than six months for that drive.

A prime architect of NOW's political and legislative agenda, she was a senior staff member of the NOW Political Action Committee from 1978 to 1984. As NOW's political director from 1985 to 1987, she was instrumental in the successful 1986 campaign to defeat anti-abortion referendums in Arkansas, Massachusetts, Rhode Island and Oregon.

In April 1989, she helped to carry the banner for the March for Women's Equality / Women's Lives, which drew 600,000 marchers to Washington in support of abortion rights and the ERA.

She defeated Noreen Connell in the 1987 NOW presidential election. On taking office, she vowed to make the organization more visible and work to defeat President Reagan's nomination of Judge Robert H. Bork to the U.S. Supreme Court, which was ultimately rejected by the U.S. Senate.

The membership of NOW grew by 110,000 during the years of her presidency and its annual budget increased 70 percent, to more than $10 million.

As NOW president, she opposed U.S. involvement in the Persian Gulf War, saying Americans should not be fighting for "clan-run monarchies" in Kuwait and Saudi Arabia that denied women's rights.

Also in 1991, she was honored in Paris by the French Alliance of Women for Democratization for her pioneering work in reproductive rights; she had been a leader in the effort to get Paris-based manufacturer Roussel Uclaf to make the so-called "French abortion pill" (the "morning-after pill", RU-486) available in the United States.

She received the Feminist Majority Foundation's lifetime achievement award for "tireless work for women's rights, for women and girls in sports, for the Equal Rights Amendment for Women, for civil rights for all Americans, for her championing of the trade union movement, and her devotion to world peace and non-violence."

She died peacefully in her sleep at age 93 at a nursing home in suburban Pittsburgh on September 20, 2005.

References

External links

1912 births
2005 deaths
American feminists
Politicians from Pittsburgh
Presidents of the National Organization for Women
Swarthmore College alumni
Equal Rights Amendment activists